Příklady táhnou (roughly translating to Examples drag), is a 1939 Czechoslovak comedy film, directed by Miroslav Cikán. It stars  Růžena Nasková, Nataša Gollová, Stella Májová.

References

External links
Příklady táhnou at the Internet Movie Database

1939 films
Czechoslovak comedy films
1939 comedy films
Films directed by Miroslav Cikán
Czechoslovak black-and-white films
1930s Czech films